Bolshoye Ivankovo is a rural locality (a village) in Kolokshanskoye Rural Settlement, Sobinsky District, Vladimir Oblast, Russia. The population was 68 as of 2010. There are 2 streets.

Geography 
Bolshoye Ivankovo is located 27 km northeast of Sobinka (the district's administrative centre) by road. Ustye is the nearest rural locality.

References 

Rural localities in Sobinsky District